Menad Benchellali is a suspected terrorist arrested in France on January 6, 2004.
Benchellali is alleged to have been an al Qaeda chemical weapons specialist.

According to the Washington Post, Benchellali was known as "the chemist.  French investigators assert that, when Benchellali returned to France, from Afghanistan, he built a home lab in his bedroom, where he manufactured ricin.

Benchellali is reported to have sent his younger brother  and a friend, Nizar Sassi, to Afghanistan.
Mourad and Sassis were captured and detained in Guantanamo.

Benchellali, was convicted, along with 24 others, on June 14, 2006 for their roles in planning a terrorist attack that was to have taken place in France to support Chechen independence.
Benchellali was described as the group's leader, and received a 10-year sentence.  Benchellali's father, a younger brother, and his mother were also convicted for their roles.

Mourad Benchellali published a book about his experiences, and on June 14, 2006 the New York Times published an op-ed by Mourad, in which he blamed Menad for tricking him into attending a military training camp on what he thought would be a kind of vacation. Mourad said he was looking forward to his day in court, for attending that training camp, after spending years in detention, without charge, in Guantanamo.

References

People imprisoned on charges of terrorism
Living people
Year of birth missing (living people)